An indoor water park is a type of water park that is located inside a building. An indoor water park has the ability to stay open year-round, as it is not affected by weather conditions.

History

In 1985 an indoor water park was open in Edmonton, Alberta, Canada at the West Edmonton Mall. It was a success for the mall and remains as one of the largest indoor water parks in the world. In 1985  opened in France. Another indoor water park in Europe was built in Blackpool in 1986. It is called the Sandcastle Water Park.

The first indoor water park in the United States known as the Polynesian Resort Hotel and Suites in the small tourist town of Wisconsin Dells, WI. The hotel opened in 1989 and the water park in 1994.  It was built in an effort to make the Dells a year-round tourist destination, rather than just a summer one. Since then, the Great Wolf Lodge brand has expanded, with multiple locations in the U.S. and a single venue in Canada, at Niagara Falls. The DreamWorks Water Park, originally slated to open in late 2019, will be the United States' largest water park upon opening.

The indoor water park craze
Since the opening of the first park, the indoor water park business has become increasingly popular, especially for Edmonton in Canada, and Wisconsin Dells in the U.S., which proclaims itself as the "Water Park Capital of the World". This includes Great Wolf Lodge, Kalahari (Wisconsin's Largest Indoor Water Park), Chula Vista Resort (Lost Rios), Wilderness Territory (Wild West, Klondike Kavern, Wild WaterDome), and the Hotel Rome at Mt. Olympus. Wisconsin has the most indoor water parks in one state. Other states in the U.S., especially in the midwest, are building more indoor water parks separate or to existing hotels so they can become a year-round destination. More water parks are also being built in Canada, Europe and Asia. Tropical Islands Resort (Krausnick-Groß Wasserburg, Germany) with an area of 66,000 m² (710,000 sq feet) is currently the largest indoor water park in the world.

Features

Most major indoor water parks have:  
Water slides
Body slides
Speed slides
Children's Play Area with sprayers, tipping buckets, slides, and geysers.  A typical example might be "Canada's Wonderland" "Pump House" attraction.
Family rides (Ride that can occupy over 3 guests)
Lazy rivers or torrent rivers
Wave pool
Water Coaster (Master Blaster)
Other attractions (FlowRider, Mat Racing Slides, Tornado Vortex Ride, Pro Bowl/Behehmoth Bowl, etc.)

See also
List of waterparks

References

Water parks
Buildings and structures by type